is a traditional Japanese children's game similar to marbles. It is played with small coin-shaped pieces also called ohajiki. The pieces are typically made of glass or plastic, although historically the game was often played with pebbles or go stones. The game became popular as an indoor game for girls during the Edo period.

References

Japanese games
Children's games
Games of physical skill
Traditional toys
Edo period